Fernando Gutiérrez Barrios (October 26, 1927 – October 30, 2000) was a Mexican politician affiliated with the Institutional Revolutionary Party (PRI). He was in charge of the Dirección Federal de Seguridad secret police at the midst of the dirty war (1964–1970), served as governor of Veracruz (1986–1988) and as Secretary of the Interior in the cabinet of President Carlos Salinas de Gortari.

Gutiérrez Barrios was born in Veracruz, Veracruz. His parents were Fernando Gutiérrez Ferrer and Ana María Barrios. He graduated from the Colegio Militar military academy in 1947 and joined the Institutional Revolutionary Party in 1950.

In 2000, voters elected Gutiérrez Barrios as a senator for the LVIII and LIX Legislature. While he took the oath of office on September 1, 2000, he died nearly two months later, on October 30. He was replaced by his alternate, Noemí Zoila Guzmán Lagunes.

Source: Diccionario biográfico del gobierno mexicano, Ed. Fondo de Cultura Económica, Mexico, 1992

See also 
 An Unknown Enemy (2018 TV series based on his life)

References

External links
The Guardian: Fernando Gutiérrez Barrios obituary

1927 births
2000 deaths
Governors of Veracruz
Politicians from Veracruz
Institutional Revolutionary Party politicians
Mexican Secretaries of the Interior
People from Veracruz (city)
21st-century Mexican politicians
20th-century Mexican politicians